Ralph Rexford Bellamy (June 17, 1904 – November 29, 1991) was an American actor whose career spanned 65 years on stage, film, and television. During his career, he played leading roles as well as supporting roles, garnering acclaim and awards, including a Tony Award for Best Dramatic Actor in Sunrise at Campobello and Oscar nomination for Best Supporting Actor for The Awful Truth (1937).

Early life
Bellamy was born in Chicago. He was the son of Lilla Louise (née Smith), a native of Canada, and Charles Rexford Bellamy. He ran away from home when he was 15 and managed to gain employment in a road show. He toured with road shows before finally landing in New York City. He began acting on stage there and, by 1927, owned his own theater company. In 1931, he made his film debut and worked constantly throughout the decade both as a lead and as a capable supporting actor. He co-starred in five films with Fay Wray.

Film and television career

His film career began with The Secret Six (1931), starring Wallace Beery and featuring Jean Harlow and Clark Gable. By the end of 1933, he had already appeared in 22 movies, including Rebecca of Sunnybrook Farm (1932) and the second lead in the action film Picture Snatcher with James Cagney (1933). He played in seven more films in 1934 alone, including Woman in the Dark, based on a Dashiell Hammett story, in which Bellamy played the lead, second-billed under Fay Wray. Bellamy received a nomination for the Academy Award for Best Supporting Actor for his role in The Awful Truth (1937) with Irene Dunne and Cary Grant, and played a similar part, that of a naive boyfriend competing with Grant's sophisticated character, in His Girl Friday (1940). He portrayed detective Ellery Queen in a few films during the 1940s, but as his film career did not progress, he returned to the stage, where he continued to perform throughout the 1950s. Bellamy appeared in other movies during this time, including Dance, Girl, Dance (1940) with Maureen O'Hara and Lucille Ball, and the horror classic The Wolf Man (1941) with Lon Chaney, Jr. and Evelyn Ankers. He also appeared in The Ghost of Frankenstein (1942) with Chaney and Bela Lugosi.

In 1949, Bellamy starred in the television series Man Against Crime (also known as Follow That Man) on the DuMont Television Network; initially telecast live in its earlier seasons, the program lasted until 1956 and was simulcast for a season on Dumont and NBC and ran on CBS during a different year. The lead role was taken by Frank Lovejoy in 1956, who subsequently starred in Meet McGraw.

Bellamy appeared on television in numerous roles over the following years. He was a regular panelist on the game show To Tell the Truth during its initial run. Bellamy starred as Willard Mitchell, along with Patricia Breslin and Paul Fix, in the 1961 episode "The Haven" of The DuPont Show with June Allyson. About this same time, he appeared on The Barbara Stanwyck Show. In December 1961, he portrayed the part of Judge Quince in the episode "Judgement at Hondo Seco" on Rawhide.

During the 1963–1964 television season, Bellamy co-starred with Jack Ging in The Eleventh Hour in the role of a psychiatrist. Wendell Corey had appeared in the first season of the series.

Bellamy appeared on Broadway as Franklin Delano Roosevelt in Sunrise at Campobello, winning a Tony Award for the role in 1957. He reprised the role in the 1960 film version.

In the summer of 1961, Bellamy hosted nine original episodes of Frontier Justice. In 1950, Bellamy became a member of The Lambs, an actors club located in New York.

Bellamy appeared in Death Valley Days ("The Vintage Years", 1962) as Daniel Quint, a minister. In the story, a young woman whom Quint befriends on a stagecoach ride, Lorna Erickson (Merry Anders), sets him up to be robbed by her paramour (William Bryant).

Highly regarded within the industry, Bellamy served four terms as the president of Actors' Equity from 1952 to 1964. On film, Bellamy starred in The Professionals (1966) as an oil tycoon, and in Roman Polanski's Rosemary's Baby (1968) as an evil physician. He turned to television during the 1970s. He played many roles in numerous shows, sometimes as a series regular. In 1970, he played the lead role of Ethan Arcane in the series The Most Deadly Game. Bellamy portrayed Adlai Stevenson in the TV movie The Missiles of October (1974), a treatment of the Cuban Missile Crisis. He was a member of the cast of the short-lived series Hunter in 1977.

An Emmy Award nomination for the mini-series The Winds of War (1983) – in which Bellamy reprised his Sunrise at Campobello role of Franklin D. Roosevelt – brought him back into the spotlight. This role was followed by his role as Randolph Duke, a conniving millionaire commodities trader in Trading Places (1983). The Eddie Murphy film Coming to America (1988) included a brief cameo by Bellamy and Don Ameche, reprising their roles as the Duke brothers. Around this time, he again portrayed Franklin Roosevelt in War and Remembrance (1988), the sequel to The Winds of War.

Among his later roles was an appearance as a once-brilliant but increasingly senile lawyer sadly skewered by Jimmy Smits' character on an episode of L.A. Law. Bellamy continued working regularly and gave his final performance in Pretty Woman (1990).

Personal life and death
Throughout the 1930s and 1940s, Bellamy was seen socially with a select circle of friends known affectionately as the Irish Mafia, but they preferred the less sensational Boy's Club as its name. This group consisted of a group of Hollywood A-listers who were mainly of Irish descent (despite Bellamy having no Irish family connections). Others included James Cagney, Pat O'Brien, Spencer Tracy, Lynne Overman, Frank Morgan and Frank McHugh. Bellamy opened the Palm Springs Racquet Club in Palm Springs, California, with fellow actor Charles Farrell in 1934.

Bellamy was married four times: first to Alice Delbridge (1927–1930), then to Catherine Willard (1931–1945). On the occasion of his marriage to organist Ethel Smith (1945–1947), Time magazine reported "Ralph Bellamy, 41, veteran stage (Tomorrow the World) and screen (Guest in the House) actor; and Ethel Smith, 32, thin, Tico-Tico-famed cinema electric organist (Bathing Beauty); he for the third time, she for the second; in Harrison, N.Y." She was in fact age 42 at the time. Bellamy's fourth wife was Alice Murphy (1949–1991; his death).

A Democrat, Bellamy was in attendance at the 1960 Democratic National Convention in Los Angeles.

On November 29, 1991, Bellamy died from a lung ailment at Saint John's Health Center in Santa Monica, California. He was 87 years old.

Awards and honors
In 1984, Bellamy was presented with a Life Achievement Award from the Screen Actors Guild, and in 1987, he received an Honorary Academy Award "for his unique artistry and his distinguished service to the profession of acting." Bellamy has a star on the Hollywood Walk of Fame at 6542 Hollywood Boulevard. In 1992, a Golden Palm Star on the Walk of Stars was dedicated to him.

In a 2007 episode of Boston Legal, footage of a 1957 episode of Studio One was used. The episode featured Bellamy and William Shatner as a father-and-son lawyer duo. This was used in the present day to explain the relationship between Shatner's Denny Crane character and his father in the show.

Filmography

Short subjects
 Screen Snapshots Series 15, No. 7 (1936)
 Screen Snapshots Series 16, No. 12 (1937)
 Breakdowns of 1938 (1938)
 What's My Line?, the "mystery guest" three times (in March 1952, January 1958 and September 1960)

Radio appearances

See also

 List of people from California
 List of people from Palm Springs, California

References

Notes

Bibliography

 Lamparski, Richard. Whatever Became Of ....? – Third Series. New York: Crown Publishers, Inc., 1970.  .
 Maltin, Leonard. "Ralph Bellamy". Leonard Maltin's Movie Encyclopedia. New York: Dutton, 1994. .
 Nieman, Greg. Palm Springs Legends: Creation of a Desert Oasis. San Diego, California: Sunbelt Publications, 2006. .
 Rippingale, Sally Presley. The History of the Racquet Club of Palm Springs. Yucaipa, California: US Business Specialties, 1984. .

External links

 
 
 
 Character portraits of Ralph Bellamy in 'Trade Winds'1938 by Ned Scott

1904 births
1991 deaths
20th-century American male actors
Academy Honorary Award recipients
Screen Actors Guild Life Achievement Award
Male actors from Chicago
American male film actors
American male stage actors
American male television actors
Male actors from Palm Springs, California
Tony Award winners
American people of Canadian descent
California Democrats
Illinois Democrats
Deaths from lung disease
Presidents of the Actors' Equity Association